Western Leader is a local newspaper in Auckland, New Zealand. It is owned by the media business Stuff Ltd. It was launched in 1963 and is published three times a week. The newspaper operates from the John Henry Centre on Pioneer Street in Henderson, and had a circulation of 77,950 in 2013, an increase of 11,000 over 2010.

In 2019, reporter Torika Tokalau won the Community Journalist of the Year Award at the 2019 Voyager Media Awards.

References

External links
 Western Leader website

Mass media in Auckland
Newspapers published in New Zealand
Newspapers established in 1963
Stuff (company)
1963 establishments in New Zealand